David Hernández Pérez (born 30 March 1960) is a Mexican politician affiliated with the Movimiento de Regeneración Nacional. As of 2018, he served as Deputy of the LIX Legislature of the Mexican Congress, representing Jalisco.

References

1960 births
Living people
People from Guadalajara, Jalisco
Institutional Revolutionary Party politicians
21st-century Mexican politicians
Deputies of the LIX Legislature of Mexico
Members of the Chamber of Deputies (Mexico) for Jalisco